Richard Harrington,  (February 24, 1911 – October 11, 2005) was a Canadian photographer. He is best known for his photographs taken in the Canadian Arctic between 1948 and 1953, including his iconic shot of the 1950 Canadian caribou famine and his 1949 photograph of Helen Konek.

Born in Hamburg, Germany, he immigrated to Canada in the mid-1920s. During his career he traveled to more than 100 countries, and his photographs have appeared in more than 24 books. His work has been shown at the National Archives of Canada, the Smithsonian Institution, and the Museum of Modern Art.

In 2001, he was made an Officer of the Order of Canada.

Selected bibliography
 The face of the Arctic: a cameraman’s story in words and pictures of five journeys into the far North (1952)
 British Columbia in pictures (1958)
 The Inuit: life as it was (1981)
 Richard Harrington: Canadian Photographer (1998)

References 

 

1911 births
2005 deaths
German emigrants to Canada
Officers of the Order of Canada
Photographers from Hamburg
20th-century Canadian photographers